Akeman Street was a railway station at Woodham, Buckinghamshire, where the railway linking Ashendon Junction and Grendon Underwood Junction crossed the Akeman Street Roman road (now the A41 road).

History

The station was opened by the Great Central Railway, becoming part of the London and North Eastern Railway during the Grouping of 1923. That company then closed the station seven years later.

The site today

The buildings and platforms on top of the embankment have long been demolished, but the brick-built main station building down at road level remains and is now a private house. An overgrown single track from the former Great Central Main Line, the remains of the link to the GW/GC joint line, finishes in a set of stop blocks at the north end of the site. In August 2014 the Calvert Landfill site acquired the track bed from Akeman Street station running up to Calvert station. The track bed was transformed into a private road for landfill vehicles. This greatly reduced dirt, congestion and pot holes on local roads.

Service

References

External links
 Station on navigable O.S. map
Picture of the station 
Pictures of the site now 

Former Great Central Railway stations
Disused railway stations in Buckinghamshire
Railway stations in Great Britain opened in 1906
Railway stations in Great Britain closed in 1930
1906 establishments in England
1930 disestablishments in England